Star Wars is an American epic space-opera media franchise, centered on a film series created by George Lucas that includes Star Wars (1977), The Empire Strikes Back (1980), and Return of the Jedi (1983). The series depicts the adventures of various characters "a long time ago in a galaxy far, far away". Many derivative Star Wars works have been produced in conjunction with, between, and after the original trilogy of films, and later installments. This body of work was collectively known as the Star Wars Expanded Universe for decades.

In October 2012, The Walt Disney Company acquired Lucasfilm for $4.06 billion. In April 2014, Lucasfilm rebranded the Expanded Universe material as Star Wars Legends and declared it non-canon to the Star Wars' franchise. The company's focus would be shifted towards a restructured Star Wars canon based on new material. The first new canon adult novel was Star Wars: A New Dawn by John Jackson Miller, published in September 2014.

This is a list of original novels, novel adaptations, original junior novels, junior novel adaptations, young readers, and short stories in the Star Wars franchise. This list does not include journals, graphic novels or comic books, which can be found in the list of Star Wars comic books. Reference books and roleplaying gamebooks can be found at the list of Star Wars reference books.

Film and television adaptations

The novelizations offer an alternate take on the events of the movies. Many include discarded or slightly altered plotlines. It should be remembered that those published before 25 April 2014 are considered Legends like all other media.
 Star Wars: Episode I – The Phantom Menace (1999), by Terry Brooks (32 BBY) (A)
 Star Wars: Episode I – The Phantom Menace (junior novel) (1999), by Patricia Wrede (32 BBY) (Y)
 Star Wars: Episode II – Attack of the Clones (2002), by R.A. Salvatore (22 BBY) (A)
 Star Wars: Episode II – Attack of the Clones (junior novelization) (2002), by Patricia Wrede (22 BBY) (Y)
 Star Wars: The Clone Wars (2008), by Karen Traviss (21.5 BBY) (A)
 Star Wars: Episode III – Revenge of the Sith (2005), by Matthew Stover (19 BBY) (A)
 Star Wars: Episode III – Revenge of the Sith (junior novel) (2005), by Patricia Wrede (19 BBY) (Y)
 Star Wars: From the Adventures of Luke Skywalker/Star Wars: Episode IV – A New Hope (1976), by Alan Dean Foster as George Lucas (0 BBY–0 ABY) (A)
 Star Wars: Episode V – The Empire Strikes Back (1980), by Donald F. Glut (3 ABY) (A)
 Star Wars: Episode VI – Return of the Jedi (1983), by James Kahn (4 ABY) (A)
 Star Wars: Return of the Jedi – The Illustrated Edition (1983), by James Kahn (4 ABY)

William Shakespeare's Star Wars

 William Shakespeare's The Phantom of Menace: Star Wars Part the First (2015), by Ian Doescher (32 BBY)
 William Shakespeare's The Clone Army Attacketh: Star Wars Part the Second (2015), by Ian Doescher (22 BBY)
 William Shakespeare's Tragedy of the Sith's Revenge: Star Wars Part the Third (2015), by Ian Doescher (19 BBY)
 William Shakespeare's Star Wars (Verily, A New Hope) (2013), by Ian Doescher (0 BBY)
 William Shakespeare's The Empire Striketh Back (2014), by Ian Doescher (3 ABY)
 William Shakespeare's The Jedi Doth Return (2014), by Ian Doescher (4 ABY)
 William Shakespeare's The Force Doth Awaken (2017), by Ian Doescher (34 ABY)
 William Shakespeare's Jedi the Last (2018), by Ian Doescher (34 ABY)
 William Shakespeare's The Merry Rise of Skywalker (2020), by Ian Doescher (35 ABY)

Disney canon stories (2014–present)
Since 2014, the official Star Wars canon includes all of the movie episodes, The Clone Wars film and the television shows Star Wars: The Clone Wars, Star Wars Rebels, and Star Wars Resistance, as well as any books, comics, and video games published after April 2014.

Novels

Short stories

Star Wars Insider (2014–present)
Since 2014, various short stories have been published in Star Wars Insider.

 "Blade Squadron: Part 1" (#149, April 2014) by David J. & Mark S. Williams (4 ABY)
 "Blade Squadron: Part 2" (#150, June 2014) by David J. & Mark S. Williams (4 ABY)
 "One Thousand Levels Down" (#151, July 2014) by Alexander Freed (0 ABY)
 "The End of History" (#154, December 2014) by Alexander Freed (10 BBY)
 "Last Call at the Zero Angle" (#156, March 2015) by Jason Fry (0 ABY)
 "Orientation" (#157, April 2015) by John Jackson Miller (14 BBY)
 "Rebel Bluff" (#158, June 2015) by Michael Kogge (4 BBY)
 "Kindred Spirits" (#159, July 2015) by Christie Golden (20 BBY)
 "Blade Squadron: Zero Hour" (#160, September 2015) by David J. & Mark S. Williams (4 ABY)
 "Inbrief" (#161, November 2015) by Janine K. Spendlove (3 ABY)
 "Bait" (#162, December 2015) by Alan Dean Foster (34 ABY)
 "Scorched" (#165, May 2016) by Delilah S. Dawson (28 ABY)
 "TK-146275" (#166, June 2016) by Sylvain Neuvel (11–1 BBY)
 "Blade Squadron: Kuat" (#168, September 2016) by Mark Williams & David Williams (5 ABY)
 "Turning Point" (#169, October 2016) by Jason Hugh (4 ABY)
 "The Voice of the Empire" (#170, December 2016) by Mur Lafferty (17 BBY)
 "Blade Squadron: Jakku" (#172, April 2017) by Mark Williams & David Williams (5 ABY)

The Rise of the Empire (October 2015)
 "Mercy Mission" by Melissa Scott (14 BBY)
 "Bottleneck" by John Jackson Miller (12 BBY)
 "The Levers of Power" by Jason Fry (4 ABY)

"The Perfect Weapon"
 "The Perfect Weapon" (November 2015) by Delilah S. Dawson (34 ABY). This story is part of the Journey to Star Wars: The Force Awakens promotional campaign. Printed in the paperback edition of the Star Wars: The Force Awakens novelization.

Tales from a Galaxy Far, Far Away: Aliens
The collection Tales from a Galaxy Far, Far Away: Aliens is part of the Journey to Star Wars: The Force Awakens promotional campaign. Some stories were originally published as individual e-books, and later collected with other new stories. However, they were all published together as a book called Star Wars: Tales From a Galaxy Far, Far Away
 "All Creatures Great and Small" (November 2015) by Landry Q. Walker (34 ABY)
 "High Noon on Jakku" (November 2015) by Landry Q. Walker (34 ABY)
 "The Crimson Corsair and the Lost Treasure of Count Dooku" (November 2015) by Landry Q. Walker (31 ABY; flashbacks to 19 BBY)
 "The Face of Evil" (November 2015) by Landry Q. Walker (34 ABY)
 "A Recipe for Death" (April 2016) by Landry Q. Walker (Pre–32 BBY)
 "True Love" (April 2016) by Landry Q. Walker (34 ABY)

From a Certain Point of View (October 2017)

 "Raymus" by Gary Whitta (0 BBY)
 "The Bucket" by Christie Golden (0 BBY)
 "The Sith of Datawork" by Ken Liu (0 BBY)
 "Stories in the Sand" by Griffin McElroy (0 BBY)
 "Reirin" by Sabaa Tahir (0 BBY)
 "The Red One" by Rae Carson (0 BBY)
 "Rites" by John Jackson Miller (0 BBY)
 "Master and Apprentice" by Claudia Gray (0 BBY)
 "Beru Whitesun Lars" by Meg Cabot (0 BBY)
 "The Luckless Rodian" by Renee Ahdieh (0 BBY)
 "Not for Nothing" by Mur Lafferty (0 BBY)
 "We Don't Serve Their Kind Here" by Chuck Wendig
 "The Kloo Horn Cantina Caper" by Kelly Sue DeConnick & Matt Fraction (0 BBY)
 "Added Muscle" by Paul Dini (0 BBY)
 "You Owe Me a Ride" by Zoraida Cordova (0 BBY)
 "The Secrets of Long Snoot" by Delilah S. Dawson (0 BBY)
 "Born in the Storm" by Daniel Jose Older (0 BBY)
 "Laina" by Wil Wheaton (0 BBY)
 "Fully Operational" by Beth Revis (0 BBY)
 "An Incident Report" by Mallory Ortberg (0 BBY)
 "Change of Heart" by Elizabeth Wein (0 BBY)
 "Eclipse" by Madeleine Roux (0 BBY)
 "Verge of Greatness" by Pablo Hidalgo (0 BBY)
 "Far Too Remote" by Jeffrey Brown (0 BBY)
 "The Trigger" by Kieron Gillen (0 BBY)
 "Of MSE-6 and Men" by Glen Weldon (0 BBY)
 "Bump" by Ben Acker & Ben Blacker (0 BBY)
 "End of Watch" by Adam Christopher (0 BBY)
 "The Baptist" by Nnedi Okorafor (0 BBY)
 "Time of Death" by Cavan Scott (0 BBY)
 "There Is Another" by Gary D. Schmidt (0 BBY)
 "Palpatine" by Ian Doescher (0 BBY)
 "Sparks" by Paul S. Kemp (0 BBY–0 ABY)
 "Duty Roster" by Jason Fry (0 BBY–0 ABY)
 "Desert Son" by Pierce Brown (0 BBY–0 ABY)
 "Grounded" by Greg Rucka (0 BBY–0 ABY)
 "Contingency Plan" by Alexander Freed (0 BBY–0 ABY)
 "The Angle" by Charles Soule (0 ABY)
 "By Whatever Sun" by E.K. Johnston & Ashley Eckstein (0 ABY)
 "Whills" by Tom Angleberger (0 ABY)

Canto Bight (December 2017)
 "Rules of the Game", by Saladin Ahmed (34 ABY)
 "Hear Nothing, See Nothing, Say Nothing", by Rae Carson (34 ABY)
 "The Wine in Dreams", by Mira Grant (34 ABY)
 "The Ride", by John Jackson Miller (34 ABY)

Stories of Jedi and Sith (June 2022)
Short story anthology published by Disney Lucasfilm Press in June 2022.
"What a Jedi Makes" by Michael Kogge
"Resolve" by Alex Segura
"The Eye of the Beholder" by Sarwat Chadda
"A Jedi's Duty" by Karen Strong
"Worthless" by Delilah S. Dawson
"The Ghosts of Maul" by Michael Moreci
"Blood Moon Uprising" by Vera Strange
"Luke on the Bright Side" by Sam Maggs
"Masters" by Tessa Gratton
"Through the Turbulence" by Roseanne A. Brown

Star Wars Insider: The High Republic: Starlight Stories (December 2022)
Short story anthology published by Titan Comics in December 2022 collecting five stories originally published in the Star Wars Insider magazine.
"Go Together" by Charles Soule
"First Duty" by Cavan Scott
"Hidden Danger" by Justina Ireland
"Past Mistakes" by Cavan Scott
"Shadows Remain" by Justina Ireland

Children's books
Canon storybooks for younger readers that are shorter than a standard novel or young adult novel.

 5-Minute Star Wars Stories, by Various Authors (32 BBY-34 ABY)
 5-Minute Star Wars Stories Strike Back, by Various Authors (32 BBY-34 ABY)
 The Prequel Trilogy Stories, by Various Authors (32 BBY-19 BBY)
 The Phantom Menace Read-Along Storybook and CD, by Elizabeth Schaefer (32 BBY)
 The Phantom Menace, by Courtney Carbone (32 BBY)
 Attack of the Clones, by Geof Smith (22 BBY)
 Attack of the Clones Read-Along Storybook and CD, by Lucasfilm Book Group (22 BBY)
 Forces of Destiny: Tales of Hope & Courage, by Elizabeth Schaefer (21 BBY-34 ABY)
 Revenge of the Sith, by Geof Smith (19 BBY)
 Revenge of the Sith Read-Along Storybook and CD, by Lucasfilm Book Group (19 BBY)
 Chopper Saves the Day, by Elizabeth Schaefer (5 BBY)
 Sabine's Art Attack, by Jennifer Heddle (5 BBY)
 Zeb to the Rescue, by Michael Siglain (5 BBY)
 Ezra and the Pilot, by Jennifer Heddle (5 BBY)
 Ezra's Wookiee Rescue, by Meredith L. Rusu (5 BBY)
 The Secret Jedi: The Adventures of Kanan Jarrus: Rebel Leader, by Ben Harper (5 BBY)
 A New Hero, by Pablo Hidalgo (5 BBY)
 TIE Fighter Trouble, by Brooke Vitale (5 BBY)
 The Inquisitor's Trap, by Meredith L. Rusu (5 BBY)
 Hera's Phantom Flight, by Elizabeth Schaefer (5 BBY)
 Kanan's Jedi Training, by Elizabeth Schaefer (5 BBY)
 Always Bet on Chopper, by Meredith L. Rusu (5 BBY)
 Rogue One Secret Mission, by Jason Fry (0 BBY)
 Bounty Hunt, by Katrina Pallant (0 BBY)
 A New Hope, by Geof Smith (0 BBY-0 ABY)
 A New Hope Read-Along Storybook and CD, by Randy Thornton (0 BBY-0 ABY)
 The Rise of a Hero, by Louise Simonson (0 BBY-0 ABY)
 Escape from Darth Vader, by Michael Siglain (0 BBY)
 Trouble on Tatooine, by Nate Millici (0 BBY)
 Trapped in the Death Star!, by Michael Siglain (0 BBY)
 Death Star Battle, by Michael Siglain (0 ABY)
 The Adventures of Luke Skywalker, Jedi Knight, by Tony DiTerlizzi (0 BBY-4 ABY)
 Star Wars in Pictures: The Original Trilogy, by Ryder Windham (0 BBY-4 ABY)
 The Original Trilogy Stories, by Various Authors (0 BBY-4 ABY)
 The Power of the Dark Side, by Benjamin Harper (0 BBY-4 ABY)
 The Chewbacca Story, by Benjamin Harper (0 BBY-34 ABY)
 A Leader Named Leia, by Jennifer Heddle (0 BBY-34 ABY)
 Part of the Journey to Star Wars: The Last Jedi promotional campaign.
 Han and the Rebel Rescue, by Nate Millici (0 ABY)
 Luke and the Lost Jedi Temple, by Jason Fry (0 ABY)
 The Empire Strikes Back, by Geof Smith (3 ABY)
 The Empire Strikes Back Read-Along Storybook and CD, by Randy Thornton (3 ABY)
 AT-AT Attack!, by Calliope Glass (3 ABY)
 Use the Force, by Michael Siglain (3 ABY)
 Leia and the Great Island Escape, by Jason Fry (4 ABY)
 Return of the Jedi, by Geof Smith (4 ABY)
 Return of the Jedi Read-Along Storybook and CD, by Randy Thornton (4 ABY)
 Rescue from Jabba's Palace, by Michael Siglain (4 ABY)
 Ewoks Join the Fight, by Michael Siglain (4 ABY)
 Poe and the Missing Ship, by Nate Millici (34 ABY)
 The Force Awakens, by Christopher Nicholas (34 ABY)
 The Force Awakens Storybook, by Elizabeth Schaefer (34 ABY)
 The Force Awakens Read-Along Storybook & CD, by Elizabeth Schaefer (34 ABY)
 Rey to the Rescue!, by Lisa Stock (34 ABY)
 Finn & The First Order, by Brian Rood (34 ABY)
 Rey Meets BB-8, by Elizabeth Schaefer (34 ABY)
 Finn & Poe Team Up!, by Nate Millici (34 ABY)
 Finn & Rey Escape!, by Brian Rood (34 ABY)
 Han & Chewie Return!, by Michael Siglain (34 ABY)
 Chaos at the Castle, by Nate Millici (34 ABY)
 The Fight in the Forest, by Nate Millici (34 ABY)
 The Force Awakens: New Adventures, by David Fentiman (34 ABY)
 Finn's Mission, by David Fentiman (34 ABY)
 The Adventures of BB-8, by David Fentiman (34 ABY)
 BB-8 on the Run, by Drew Daywalt (34 ABY)
 Lightsaber Rescue, by Play-A-Sound (34 ABY)
 Rolling with BB-8!, by Benjamin Harper (34 ABY)
 Rey's Journey, by Ella Patrick (34 ABY)
 Rose and Finn's Mission, by Ella Patrick (34 ABY)
 Chewie and the Porgs, by Kevin Shinick (34 ABY)

Original Star Wars Legends stories
This body of work represents the original Star Wars expanded universe, which was rebranded as Star Wars Legends and declared non-canon to the franchise in April 2014. Beginning with the 1999 release of Star Wars: Episode I – The Phantom Menace, Lucasfilm has divided its titles by fictional "era" with symbols designating such.

Before the Republic era
This era contains stories taking place before 25,000 BBY.

Old Galactic Republic era
This era contains stories taking place between 25,000 BBY to 1,000 BBY.

Rise of the Empire era

Episode II: Attack of the Clones

The Clone Wars

 Star Wars: The Clone Wars (2008), by Karen Traviss (21.5 BBY) (Y)
 The Clone Wars: Wild Space (2008), by Karen Miller (21.5 BBY) (A)
 The Clone Wars: No Prisoners (2009), by Karen Traviss (21 BBY) (A)

Clone Wars: Gambit by Karen Miller (21 BBY)
 Stealth (2010) (A)
 Siege (2010) (A)

Clone Wars: Secret Missions by Ryder Windham (21 BBY)
 Breakout Squad (2009) (Y)
 Curse of the Black Hole Pirates (2010) (Y)
 Duel at Shattered Rock (2011) (Y)
 Guardians of the Chiss Key (2012) (Y)

Republic Commando
 Republic Commando: Hard Contact (2004), by Karen Traviss (22 BBY)
 "Omega Squad: Targets" (2005), by Karen Traviss (21 BBY) in Star Wars Insider #81 and Republic Commando: Triple Zero
 Republic Commando: Triple Zero (2006), by Karen Traviss (21 BBY)
 "Republic Commando: Odds" (2006), by Karen Traviss (21 BBY) in Star Wars Insider #87 and Republic Commando: True Colors
 Republic Commando: True Colors (2007), by Karen Traviss (21 BBY)
 Republic Commando: Order 66 (2008), by Karen Traviss (19 BBY)

Imperial Commando
 Imperial Commando: 501st (2009), by Karen Traviss (19 BBY)

Clone Wars
 Shatterpoint (2003), by Matthew Stover (21.5 BBY) (A)
 The Cestus Deception (2004), by Steven Barnes (21.5 BBY) (A)
 The Hive (2004), by Steven Barnes (21.5 BBY) (E) (A)
 Jedi Trial (2004), by David Sherman & Dan Cragg (21.5 BBY) (A)
 Yoda: Dark Rendezvous (2004), by Sean Stewart (20 BBY)
 MedStar I: Battle Surgeons (2004), by Michael Reaves & Steve Perry (20 BBY) (A)
 MedStar II: Jedi Healer (2004), by Michael Reaves & Steve Perry (20 BBY) (A)
 Labyrinth of Evil (2005), by James Luceno (19 BBY) (A)

Episode III: Revenge of the Sith

 Dark Lord: The Rise of Darth Vader (2005), by James Luceno (19 BBY) (A)
 Kenobi (2013), by John Jackson Miller (19 BBY) (A)
 "Incognito" (2013), by John Jackson Miller (19 BBY) in Star Wars Insider #143 and Kenobi (A)

Coruscant Nights (18.8 – 17 BBY)
 Jedi Twilight (2008), by Michael Reaves (18.8 BBY)
 Street of Shadows (2008), by Michael Reaves (19 BBY–18.46 BBY)
 Patterns of Force (2009), by Michael Reaves with Maya Kaathryn Bohnhoff (uncredited) (18.3 BBY)
 The Last Jedi (2013), by Michael Reaves & Maya Kaathryn Bohnhoff (18–17 BBY)

The Last of the Jedi by Jude Watson (18 BBY)
 The Desperate Mission (2005) (Y)
 Dark Warning (2005) (Y)
 Underworld (2005) (Y)
 Death on Naboo (2006) (Y)
 A Tangled Web (2006) (Y)
 Return of the Dark Side (2006) (Y)
 Secret Weapon (2007) (Y)
 Against The Empire (2007) (Y)
 Master of Deception (2008) (Y)
 Reckoning (2008) (Y)

A New Hope: The Life of Luke Skywalker (15 BBY – 4 ABY)
 A New Hope: The Life of Luke Skywalker (2009), by Ryder Windham (Y)

The Han Solo Trilogy
 The Paradise Snare (1997), by A.C. Crispin (10 BBY) (A)
 The Hutt Gambit (1997), by A.C. Crispin (5–4 BBY) (A)
 Rebel Dawn (1998), by A.C. Crispin (3–0 BBY) (A)

The Adventures of Lando Calrissian
 Lando Calrissian and the Mindharp of Sharu (1983), by L. Neil Smith (4 BBY)
 Lando Calrissian and the Flamewind of Oseon (1983), by L. Neil Smith (4 BBY)
 Lando Calrissian and the Starcave of ThonBoka (1983), by L. Neil Smith (3 BBY)

The Force Unleashed (3 – 1 BBY)
 The Force Unleashed (2008), by Sean Williams (3–2 BBY) (A)
 The Force Unleashed II (2010), by Sean Williams (1 BBY) (A)

The Han Solo Adventures (2 BBY)
 Han Solo at Stars' End (1979), by Brian Daley
 Han Solo's Revenge (1979), by Brian Daley
 Han Solo and the Lost Legacy (1980), by Brian Daley

Death Troopers
 Death Troopers (2009), by Joe Schreiber (1 BBY) (A)

Rebellion era
This era contains stories taking place within five years after the events of Star Wars Episode IV: A New Hope.

Death Star
 Death Star (2007), by Michael Reaves & Steve Perry (1 BBY – 0 BBY)

Shadow Games
 Shadow Games (2011), by Michael Reaves and Maya Kaathryn Bohnhoff (1 BBY – 0 BBY)

Episode IV: A New Hope

Rebel Force by Alex Wheeler (0 – 1 ABY)
 0 ABY
 Target (2008) (Y)
 Hostage (2008) (Y)
 Renegade (2009) (Y)
 0.5 ABY
 Firefight (2009) (Y)
 Trapped (2010) (Y)
 Uprising (2010) (1 ABY) (Y)

Scoundrels
 Winner Lose All—A Lando Calrissian Tale (2012), by Timothy Zahn (1–0 BBY) (E)
 Scoundrels (2013), by Timothy Zahn (0 ABY) (A)

Galaxy of Fear by John Whitman (0.5 ABY) (Y)
 Eaten Alive (1997)
 City of the Dead (1997)
 Planet Plague (1997)
 The Nightmare Machine (1997)
 Ghost of the Jedi (1997)
 Army of Terror (1997)
 The Brain Spiders (1997)
 The Swarm (1998)
 Spore (1998)
 The Doomsday Ship (1998)
 Clones (1998)
 The Hunger (1998)

Hand of Judgment (0.5 – 0.8 ABY)
 Allegiance (2007), by Timothy Zahn (0.5 ABY) (A)
 Choices of One (2011), by Timothy Zahn (0.8 ABY)

Smuggler's Gambit (0 – 3 ABY)
 Smuggler's Gambit (2012), by Kyle Newman, F.J. DeSanto (A)

Star Wars Galaxies
 Star Wars Galaxies: The Ruins of Dantooine (2003), by Voronica Whitney-Robinson & Haden Blackman (1 ABY) (Y)

Splinter of the Mind's Eye
 Splinter of the Mind's Eye (1978), by Alan Dean Foster (2 ABY) (A)

(2 – 3 ABY) (A)
 Razor's Edge (2013), by Martha Wells (2 ABY)
 Honor Among Thieves (2014), by James S. A. Corey (2–3 ABY)

The Further Adventures
24-page read-along book with color illustrations accompanied by a 7-inch 33 1/3 record or cassette.
 Droid World (1983), by Archie Goodwin (adapter) and Dick Foes (illustrator) (3 ABY) (Y)
 Planet of the Hoojibs (1983), by David Michelinie (adapter) and Greg Winters (illustrator) (3 ABY) (Y)

Rebel Mission to Ord Mantell
Vinyl record only, no book.
 Rebel Mission to Ord Mantell (1983), by Brian Daley (3 ABY) (Y)

Episode V: The Empire Strikes Back

Shadows of the Empire
 Shadows of the Empire (1996), by Steve Perry (3.5 ABY) (A)

Episode VI: Return of the Jedi
24-page read-along book with color illustrations accompanied by a 7-inch 33 1/3 record or cassette.
 The Ewoks Join the Fight (1983), by Bonnie Bogart (adapter) & Diane de Groat (illustrator) (4 ABY) (Y)

Golden Books
24-page illustrated children's books by Golden Books
 Journey to Mos Eisley (1998), by Jay Rudko (0 BBY) (Y)
 The Hoth Adventure (1998), by Jay Rudko (3 ABY) (Y)
 Escape from Jabba's Palace (1998), by Jay Rudko (4 ABY) (Y)
In 2015, the original six Star Wars films were adapted as Little Golden Books. In 2017, A New Hope was also released as a Big Golden Book. Additionally, Solo: A Star Wars Story and the sequel trilogy were adapted. Many other original titles featuring scenes from throughout the saga have been released, including I Am a Padawan by Ashley Eckstein. An upcoming release will adapt The Mandalorian.

The Bounty Hunter Wars
 The Mandalorian Armor (1998), by K.W. Jeter (0–4 ABY) (A)
 Slave Ship (1998), by K.W. Jeter (0–4 ABY) (A)
 Hard Merchandise (1999), by K.W. Jeter (0–4 ABY) (A)

The Truce at Bakura
 The Truce at Bakura (1993), by Kathy Tyers (4 ABY) (A)

New Republic era
This era takes place from 5 to 25 years after Star Wars Episode IV: A New Hope.

by William C. Dietz (0 – 5 ABY)
 Soldier for the Empire (1997) (0 ABY) (Y) (A)
 5 ABY
 Rebel Agent (1998) (Y) (A)
 Jedi Knight (1998) (Y) (A)

Jedi Prince by Paul & Hollace Davids (5 ABY)
 The Glove of Darth Vader (1992) (Y)
 The Lost City of the Jedi (1992) (Y)
 Zorba the Hutt's Revenge (1992) (Y)
 Mission from Mount Yoda (1993) (Y)
 Queen of the Empire (1993) (Y)
 Prophets of the Dark Side (1993) (Y)

Luke Skywalker and the Shadows of Mindor
 Luke Skywalker and the Shadows of Mindor (2008), by Matthew Stover (5.5 ABY) (A)

X-wing
 Rogue Squadron (1996), by Michael Stackpole (6.5 ABY) (A)
 Wedge's Gamble (1996), by Michael Stackpole (6.5 ABY) (A)
 The Krytos Trap (1996), by Michael Stackpole (7 ABY) (A)
 The Bacta War (1997), by Michael Stackpole (7 ABY) (A)
 Wraith Squadron (1998), by Aaron Allston (7 ABY) (A)
 Iron Fist (1998), by Aaron Allston (7.5 ABY) (A)
 Solo Command (1999), by Aaron Allston (7.5 ABY) (A)
 Isard's Revenge (1999), by Michael Stackpole (9 ABY) (A)
 Starfighters of Adumar (1999), by Aaron Allston (12–13 ABY) (A)
 Mercy Kill (2012), by Aaron Allston (13–44 ABY) (A)

The Courtship of Princess Leia
 The Courtship of Princess Leia (1994), by Dave Wolverton (8 ABY) (A)

A Forest Apart
 A Forest Apart (2003), by Troy Denning (8 ABY) (E)

Tatooine Ghost
 Tatooine Ghost (2003), by Troy Denning (8 ABY) (A)

Mixed up Droid
 Mixed up Droid (1995), by Ryder Windham (8 ABY) (A)

The Thrawn Trilogy
 Heir to the Empire (1991), by Timothy Zahn (9 ABY) (A)
 Dark Force Rising (1992), by Timothy Zahn (9 ABY) (A)
 The Last Command (1993), by Timothy Zahn (9 ABY) (A)

The Dark Empire Trilogy
 Dark Empire (1991–1992), by Tom Veitch (10 ABY) (A)
 Dark Empire II (1994–1995), by Tom Veitch (10 ABY) (A)
 Empire's End (1995), by Tom Veitch (11 ABY) (A)

Crimson Empire
 Crimson Empire (1997), by Mike Richardson, Randy Stradley (11 ABY) (A)

The Jedi Academy Trilogy
 Jedi Search (1994), by Kevin J. Anderson (11 ABY) (A)
 Dark Apprentice (1994), by Kevin J. Anderson (11 ABY) (A)
 Champions of the Force (1994), by Kevin J. Anderson (11 ABY) (A)

I, Jedi
 I, Jedi (1998), by Michael Stackpole (11 ABY) (A)

The Callista Trilogy
 Children of the Jedi (1995), by Barbara Hambly (12–13 ABY) (A)
 Darksaber (1995), by Kevin J. Anderson (12–13 ABY) (A)
 Planet of Twilight (1997), by Barbara Hambly (12–13 ABY) (A)

The Crystal Star
 The Crystal Star (1994), by Vonda McIntyre (14 ABY) (A)

The Black Fleet Crisis Trilogy
 Before the Storm (1996), by Michael P. Kube-McDowell (16 ABY) (A)
 Shield of Lies (1997), by Michael P. Kube-McDowell (16 ABY) (A)
 Tyrant's Test (1998), by Michael P. Kube-McDowell (16 ABY) (A)

The New Rebellion
 The New Rebellion (1996), by Kristine Kathryn Rusch (17 ABY) (A)

The Corellian Trilogy
 Star Wars: Ambush at Corellia (1995), by Roger MacBride Allen (18 ABY) (A)
 Assault at Selonia (1995), by Roger MacBride Allen (18 ABY) (A)
 Showdown at Centerpoint (1995), by Roger MacBride Allen (18 ABY) (A)

The Hand of Thrawn
 Specter of the Past (1997), by Timothy Zahn (19 ABY) (A)
 Vision of the Future (1998), by Timothy Zahn (19 ABY) (A)

Scourge
 Scourge (2012), by Jeff Grubb (19 ABY) (A)

Survivor's Quest
 Fool's Bargain (2004), by Timothy Zahn (22 ABY) (E)
 Survivor's Quest (2004), by Timothy Zahn (22 ABY) (A)

Junior Jedi Knights
 The Golden Globe (1995), by Nancy Richardson (22 ABY) (Y)
 Lyric's World (1996), by Nancy Richardson (22 ABY) (Y)
 Promises (1996), by Nancy Richardson (22 ABY) (Y)
 Anakin's Quest (1996), by Rebecca Moesta (22 ABY) (Y)
 Vader's Fortress (1997), by Rebecca Moesta (22 ABY) (Y)
 Kenobi's Blade (1997), by Rebecca Moesta (22 ABY) (Y)

Young Jedi Knights
 Heirs of the Force (1995), by Kevin J. Anderson & Rebecca Moesta (23–24 ABY) (Y)
 Shadow Academy (1995), by Kevin J. Anderson & Rebecca Moesta (23–24 ABY) (Y)
 The Lost Ones (1995), by Kevin J. Anderson & Rebecca Moesta (23–24 ABY) (Y)
 Lightsabers (1996), by Kevin J. Anderson & Rebecca Moesta (23–24 ABY) (Y)
 Darkest Knight (1996), by Kevin J. Anderson & Rebecca Moesta (23–24 ABY) (Y)
 Jedi Under Siege (1996), by Kevin J. Anderson & Rebecca Moesta (23–24 ABY) (Y)
 Shards of Alderaan (1997), by Kevin J. Anderson & Rebecca Moesta (23–24 ABY) (Y)
 Diversity Alliance (1997), by Kevin J. Anderson & Rebecca Moesta (23–24 ABY) (Y)
 Delusions of Grandeur (1997), by Kevin J. Anderson & Rebecca Moesta (23–24 ABY) (Y)
 Jedi Bounty (1997), by Kevin J. Anderson & Rebecca Moesta (23–24 ABY) (Y)
 The Emperor's Plague (1997), by Kevin J. Anderson & Rebecca Moesta (23–24 ABY) (Y)
 Return to Ord Mantell (1998), by Kevin J. Anderson & Rebecca Moesta (23–24 ABY) (Y)
 Trouble on Cloud City (1998), by Kevin J. Anderson & Rebecca Moesta (23–24 ABY) (Y)
 Crisis at Crystal Reef (1998), by Kevin J. Anderson & Rebecca Moesta (23–24 ABY) (Y)
 Jedi Shadow (Omnibus – Heirs of the Force, Shadow Academy & The Lost Ones), by Kevin J. Anderson & Rebecca Moesta (23–24 ABY) (Y)
 Jedi Sunrise (Omnibus – Lightsabers, Darkest Knight, & Jedi Under Siege), by Kevin J. Anderson & Rebecca Moesta (23–24 ABY) (Y)
 Under the Black Sun (Omnibus – Return to Ord Mantell, Trouble on Cloud City, & Crisis at Crystal Reef), by Kevin J. Anderson & Rebecca Moesta (23–24 ABY) (Y)

New Jedi Order era
This era takes place within 25 to 39 years after Star Wars Episode IV: A New Hope.

A Practical Man
 Boba Fett: A Practical Man (2006), by Karen Traviss (25 ABY) (E)

The New Jedi Order
 Vector Prime (1999), by R.A. Salvatore (25 ABY) (A)
 Dark Tide I: Onslaught (2000), by Michael Stackpole (25 ABY) (A)
 Dark Tide II: Ruin (2000), by Michael Stackpole (25 ABY) (A)
 Agents of Chaos I: Hero's Trial (2000), by James Luceno (25 ABY) (A)
 Agents of Chaos II: Jedi Eclipse (2000), by James Luceno (25 ABY) (A)
 Balance Point (2000), by Kathy Tyers (26 ABY) (A)
 Recovery (2001), by Troy Denning (26 ABY) (E)
 Edge of Victory I: Conquest (2001), by Greg Keyes (26 ABY) (A)
 Edge of Victory II: Rebirth (2001), by Greg Keyes (27 ABY) (A)
 "Emissary of the Void" (2002), by Greg Keyes (26–27 ABY), serialized epic published in Star Wars Gamer, issues 8–10, and Star Wars Insider, issues 62–64 (A)
 Star by Star (2001), by Troy Denning (27 ABY) (A)
 Dark Journey (2002), by Elaine Cunningham (27 ABY) (A)
 Enemy Lines I: Rebel Dream (2002), by Aaron Allston (27 ABY) (A)
 Enemy Lines II: Rebel Stand (2002), by Aaron Allston (27 ABY) (A)
 Traitor (2002), by Matthew Stover (27 ABY) (A)
 Destiny's Way (2002), by Walter Jon Williams (28 ABY) (A)
 Ylesia (2002), by Walter Jon Williams (28 ABY) (E)
 Force Heretic I: Remnant (2003), by Sean Williams & Shane Dix (28 ABY) (A)
 Force Heretic II: Refugee (2003), by Sean Williams & Shane Dix (28 ABY) (A)
 Force Heretic III: Reunion (2003), by Sean Williams & Shane Dix (28–29 ABY) (A)
 The Final Prophecy (2003), by Greg Keyes (29 ABY) (A)
 The Unifying Force (2003), by James Luceno (29 ABY) (A)

The Dark Nest trilogy
 The Joiner King (2005), by Troy Denning (35 ABY) (A)
 The Unseen Queen (2005), by Troy Denning (36 ABY) (A)
 The Swarm War (2005), by Troy Denning (36 ABY) (A)

Legacy era
This era takes place 40+ years after Star Wars Episode IV: A New Hope.

Legacy of the Force
 Betrayal (2006), by Aaron Allston (40 ABY) (A)
 Bloodlines (2006), by Karen Traviss (40 ABY) (A)
 Tempest (2006), by Troy Denning (40 ABY) (A)
 Exile (2007), by Aaron Allston (40 ABY) (A)
 Sacrifice (2007), by Karen Traviss (40 ABY) (A)
 Inferno (2007), by Troy Denning (40 ABY) (A)
 Fury (2007), by Aaron Allston (40 ABY) (A)
 Revelation (2008), by Karen Traviss (40 ABY) (A)
 Invincible (2008), by Troy Denning (41 ABY) (A)

Crosscurrent
 Crosscurrent (2010), by Paul S. Kemp (41 ABY) (A)
 Riptide (2011), by Paul S. Kemp (41 ABY) (A)

Millennium Falcon
 Millennium Falcon (2008), by James Luceno (60 BBY, 19 BBY, 10 BBY, 5 BBY, 43 ABY) (A)

Fate of the Jedi

 Outcast (2009), by Aaron Allston (43.5 ABY) (A)
 Omen (2009), by Christie Golden (43.5 ABY) (A)
 Abyss (2009), by Troy Denning (43.5 ABY) (A)
 Backlash (2010), by Aaron Allston (44 ABY) (A)
 Allies (2010), by Christie Golden (44 ABY) (A)
 Vortex (2010), by Troy Denning (44 ABY) (A)
 Conviction (2011), by Aaron Allston (44.5 ABY) (A)
 Ascension (2011), by Christie Golden (44.5 ABY) (A)
 Apocalypse (2012), by Troy Denning (44.5 ABY) (A)

Crucible
 Crucible (2013), by Troy Denning (45 ABY) (A)

Short story anthologies
These books contain short Star Wars stories from several notable science-fiction authors with stories that span different timelines.
 Tales from the Mos Eisley Cantina (1995), edited by Kevin J. Anderson (0–3 ABY) (E)
 Tales from Jabba's Palace (1995), edited by Kevin J. Anderson (4 ABY)
 Tales of the Bounty Hunters (1996), edited by Kevin J. Anderson (3 ABY)
 Tales from the Empire (1997), edited by Peter Schweighofer (Various) (4 ABY)
 Tales from the New Republic (1999), edited by Peter Schweighofer and Craig Carey (Various) (4 ABY)
 Star Wars: Science Adventures (1999), authored by Jude Watson and K.D. Burkett.
 Crisis of Faith (2011), authored by Timothy Zahn.

Other
Non-canon stories that are not part of the Star Wars Legends branding.

Notes

References

Books

Star Wars
Book series introduced in 1976
Star Wars
Novels based on films